A Grand Master is a title of honour as well as an office in Freemasonry, given to a freemason elected to oversee a Masonic jurisdiction, derived from the office of Grand Masters in chivalric orders. He presides over a Grand Lodge and has certain rights in the constituent Lodges that form his jurisdiction. In most, but not all cases, the Grand Master is styled "Most Worshipful Grand Master." One example of a differing title exists in the Grand Lodge of Pennsylvania, where the Grand Master is titled "Right Worshipful". Under the Grand Lodge of Scotland, the role is titled "Grand Master Mason".

Deputies
Just as the Worshipful Master of a Lodge annually appoints lodge officers to assist him, so the Grand Master of each Grand Lodge annually appoints Grand Lodge officers to assist him in his work. Grand Lodges often elect or appoint Deputy Grand Masters (sometimes also known as District Deputy Grand Masters) who can act on behalf of the Grand Master when he is unable to do so.

In the United Grand Lodge of England, if the Grand Master is traditionally a Prince of the Blood Royal (ie: a member of the Royal Family), he may appoint a 'Pro Grand Master' ('Pro' is from the Latin for 'for') to be "his principal adviser, and to act for him on those occasions when, due to royal engagements, he is unable to be present".  The Pro Grand Master is distinct from the Deputy Grand Master.

Traditions
There are two distinct traditions in connection with the office of Grand Master. Generally speaking, the European practice is for the same Grand Master to be re-elected for several consecutive years, maybe even several decades, whilst in other countries, a Grand Master serves a set term of only one to three years and then retires.

In several European countries, the position of Grand Master has often been held by members of royal families or the high nobility. In some Protestant northern European countries, the position was held by the King for a long time. In England and Wales, the current Grand Master is Prince Edward, Duke of Kent, who was elected in 1967 and has been re-elected each year since.

See also 
Provincial Grand Master
Grand Master (order)

References